Manfred Kizito (born 14 March 1980) is a retired footballer who played as a midfielder. Born in Uganda, he represented Rwanda at international lebvel.

Club career
Born in Kampala, Uganda, Kizito spent his early career playing for Police and Villa, before moving to Rwanda in 2005 to play with APR and ATRACO.

International career
Despite being born in Uganda, Kizito was offered a Rwandan passport, and represented their national side, earning 19 caps between 2004 and 2007, including in six FIFA World Cup qualifying matches.

Personal life
His brother Nestroy is also a footballer.

References

1980 births
Living people
Rwandan footballers
Rwanda international footballers
Ugandan footballers
Ugandan emigrants to Rwanda
Police FC (Uganda) players
SC Villa players
APR F.C. players
ATRACO F.C. players
Association football midfielders
Sportspeople from Kampala